Lambayong, officially the Municipality of Lambayong, is a 2nd class municipality in the province of Sultan Kudarat, Philippines. According to the 2020 census, it has a population of 79,739 people.

Etymology
Lambayong is named after the flower-bearing creeper that grows in profusion on wet lands with which the town has plenty. The purplish cup-like petals are a sight to behold from a distance as they undulate with the dark waxy-textured green leaves when blown by the wind.

The word Lambayong in Maguindanao means violet.

History
The municipality of Lambayong was transferred from Cotabato Province to Province of Sultan Kudarat on November 22, 1973, by Presidential Decree No. 341 of President Ferdinand E. Marcos. It was named as Mariano Marcos in honor of his father.

On October 12, 1988, President Corazon Aquino signed Republic Act No. 6676, renaming the municipality to its current name.

Geography

Barangays
Lambayong is politically subdivided into 26 barangays.

Climate

Demographics

Economy

References

External links
Lambayong Profile at PhilAtlas.com
Lambayong Profile at the DTI Cities and Municipalities Competitive Index
[ Philippine Standard Geographic Code]
Philippine Census Information
Local Governance Performance Management System

Municipalities of Sultan Kudarat